This is a list of notable people who have been said to be a messiah, either by themselves or by their followers. The list is divided into categories, which are sorted according to date of birth (where known).

Jewish messiah claimants

In Judaism, "messiah" originally meant a divinely appointed king, such as David, Cyrus the Great or Alexander the Great. Later, especially after the failure of the Hasmonean Kingdom (37 BC) and the Jewish–Roman wars (AD 66–135), the figure of the Jewish messiah was one who would deliver the Jews from oppression and usher in an Olam Haba ("world to come") or Messianic Age.
However the term "false messiah" was largely absent from rabbinic literature. The first mention is in the Sefer Zerubbabel, from the mid-seventh century, which uses the term, mashiah sheker, ("false messiah").
 Jesus of Nazareth (c. 4 BC – 30/33 AD), leader of a "marginal Jewish apocalyptic cult" who was crucified by the Roman Empire for alleged sedition and is believed by Christians to have been resurrected. Jews who believed him to be the Messiah were originally called Nazarenes and later they were known as Jewish Christians (the first Christians). Baháʼís, Muslims, and Christians (including Messianic Jews) believe him to be the Messiah.
 Dositheos the Samaritan (mid 1st century), Origen wrote that Dositheos wished to persuade the Samaritans that he was the Jewish Messiah who was prophesied by Moses, and classes him with John the Baptist, Theodas, and Judas of Galilee as people whom the Jews mistakenly held to be the Christ (Hom. xxv in Lucam; Contra Celsum, I, lvii).
 Simon bar Kokhba, born Simon ben Koseva, (d. 135 AD) who led the apical Bar Kokhba revolt against the Roman Empire. For three years, bar Kokhba ruled as the nasi, or prince, of a semi-independent secessionist state in Israel. Some rabbinical scholars, including the great sage Akiva, proclaimed bar Kokhba as the Messiah. He died during the rebels' last stand at the fortress of Betar, after which the rebellion was brutally crushed and the land was left largely decimated, cementing both the slowly growing Jewish diaspora and the schism between Christianity and Judaism.
 Shlomo Molcho, born Diogo Pires (1500-1532) in Lisbon to parents who were Jewish converts to Christianity. After meeting David Reuveni, he left his post as secretary to the king's council, traveled to Damascus, Safed, Jerusalem and later Solonika, where he studied kabbalah and became a mystic. He was eventually reunited with Reuveni, declared his aspirations as messiah, and was finally burned at the stake by the Holy Roman Emperor Charles V, for refusing to convert back to Christianity. 
 Sabbatai Zevi (alternative spellings: Shabbetai, Sabbetai, Shabbesai; Zvi, Tzvi) (b. at Smyrna 1626; d. at Dulcigno (present day Ulcinj) 1676), a Sephardic ordained rabbi from Smyrna (now İzmir, Turkey), who was active throughout the Ottoman Empire and claimed to be the long-awaited Messiah. He was the founder of the Sabbatean movement, whose followers subsequently were to be known as Dönmeh "converts" or crypto-Jews - one of the most important messianic movements, whose influence was widespread throughout Jewry. His influence is felt even today. After his death, Sabbatai was followed by a line of putative followers who declared themselves Messiahs and are sometimes grouped as the "Sabbethaian Messiahs".
See also Combination messiah claimants below.

Christian messiah claimants

The Christian Bible states that Jesus will come again in some fashion; various people have claimed to, in fact, be the second coming of Jesus. Others have styled themselves new messiahs under the umbrella of Christianity.
The Synoptic gospels (Matthew 24:4, 6, 24; Mark 13:5, 21-22; and Luke 21:3) all use the term pseudochristos for messianic pretenders.
 Ann Lee (1736–1784), a central figure to the Shakers, who thought she "embodied all the perfections of God" in female form and considered herself to be Christ's female counterpart in 1772.
 John Nichols Thom (1799–1838), who had achieved fame and followers as Sir William Courtenay and adopted the claim of Messiah after a period in a mental institute.
 Abd-ru-shin (Oskar Ernst Bernhardt, 18 April 1875 – 6 December 1941), founder of the Grail Movement.
 Lou de Palingboer (Louwrens Voorthuijzen) (1898-1968), a Dutch charismatic leader who claimed to be God as well as the Messiah from 1950 until his death in 1968.
 Father Divine (George Baker) (c. 1880 –1965), an African American spiritual leader from about 1907 until his death, who claimed to be God.
 André Matsoua (1899–1942), Congolese founder of Amicale, proponents of which subsequently adopted him as Messiah in the late 1920s.
 Samael Aun Weor (1917–1977), born Víctor Manuel Gómez Rodríguez, Colombian citizen and later Mexican, was an author, lecturer and founder of the 'Universal Christian Gnostic Movement', according to him, 'the most powerful movement ever founded'. By 1972, he referenced that his death and resurrection would occur before 1978.
 Ahn Sahng-hong (1918–1985), founder of the World Mission Society Church of God and worshiped by the members as the Messiah.
 Sun Myung Moon (1920–2012), founder and leader of the Unification Church established in Seoul, South Korea, who considered himself the Second Coming of Christ, but not Jesus himself. It is generally believed by Unification Church members ("Moonies") that he was the Messiah and the Second Coming of Christ and was anointed to fulfill Jesus' unfinished mission.
 Cho Hee-Seung (1931–2004) founder of the Victory Altar New Religious Movement, which refers to him as “the Victor Christ” and “God incarnated”.  Died in the midst of a series of legal battles in which he was alternately convicted and acquitted on charges fraud and instigation of the murders of multiple opponents.  
 Yahweh ben Yahweh (1935–2007), born as Hulon Mitchell, Jr., a black nationalist and separatist who created the Nation of Yahweh and allegedly orchestrated the murder of dozens of people. 
 Laszlo Toth (born 1938) claimed he was Jesus Christ as he battered Michelangelo's Pieta with a geologist hammer.
 Wayne Bent (born 1941), also known as Michael Travesser of the Lord Our Righteousness Church, also known as the "Strong City Cult", convicted December 15, 2008 of one count of criminal sexual contact of a minor and two counts of contributing to the delinquency of a minor in 2008.
 Iesu Matayoshi (1944–2018); in 1997 he established the World Economic Community Party based on his conviction that he was God and the Christ.
 Jung Myung-seok (born 1945), a South Korean who was a member of the Unification Church in the 1970s, before breaking off to found the dissenting group now known as Providence Church in 1980. He also considers himself the Second Coming of Christ, but not Jesus himself. He believes he has come to finish the incomplete message and mission of Jesus Christ, asserting that he is the Messiah and has the responsibility to save all mankind. He claims that the Christian doctrine of resurrection is false but that people can be saved through him.
 Claude Vorilhon, now known as Raël "messenger of the Elohim" (born 1946), a French professional test driver and former car journalist who became founder and leader of UFO religion the Raël Movement in 1972.  Raëlism teaches that life on Earth was scientifically created by a species of extraterrestrials, which they call Elohim. He claimed he met an extraterrestrial humanoid in 1973 and became the Messiah. He then devoted himself to the task he said he was given by his "biological father", an extraterrestrial named Yahweh.
 José Luis de Jesús (1946–2013), founder and leader of Creciendo en Gracia sect (Growing In Grace International Ministry, Inc.), based in Miami, Florida. He claimed to be both Jesus Christ returned and the Antichrist, and exhibited a "666" tattoo on his forearm. He has referred to himself as Jesucristo Hombre, which translates to "Jesus Christ made Man".
 Inri Cristo (born 1948) of Indaial, Brazil, a claimant to be the second Jesus.
 Apollo Quiboloy (born 1950), founder and leader of the Kingdom of Jesus Christ religious group, who claims that Jesus Christ is the "Almighty Father," that Quiboloy is "His Appointed Son," and that salvation is now completed. He proclaims himself to be the "Appointed Son of God".
 Brian David Mitchell, (born 1953 in Salt Lake City, Utah), believed himself the fore-ordained angel born on earth to be the Davidic "servant" prepared by God as a type of Messiah who would restore the divinely led kingdom of Israel to the world in preparation for Christ's second coming. Mitchell's belief in such an end-times figure – also known among many fundamentalist Latter Day Saints as "the One Mighty and Strong" – appeared to be based in part on a reading of the biblical Book of Isaiah by the independent LDS Hebraist, Avraham Gileadi, with whom Mitchell became familiar as a result of his previous participation in Stirling Allan's American Study Group.
 Ante Pavlović (1957–2020), was Croatian self-proclaimed chiropractor who claimed to be reincarnation of Jesus Christ and "a Christ who came", about to become president of Croatia.
 David Koresh (Vernon Wayne Howell) (1959–1993), leader of the Branch Davidians, renaming himself in honor of King David and Cyrus the Great. He and his followers were killed after an ATF raid and siege which ended with their compound catching fire. 
 Maria Devi Christos (born 1960), leader of the Great White Brotherhood popular in the former Soviet Union. 
 Sergey Torop (born 1961), who started to call himself "Vissarion", founder of the Church of the Last Testament and the spiritual community Ecopolis Tiberkul in Southern Siberia.
 Alan John Miller (born 1962), founder of Divine Truth, a new religious movement based in Australia. Also known as A.J. Miller, he claims to be Jesus of Nazareth through reincarnation. Miller was formerly a Jehovah's Witness.
See also Combination messiah claimants below.

Muslim messiah claimants

Islamic tradition has a prophecy of the Mahdi, who will come alongside the return of Isa (Jesus).
 Muhammad Jaunpuri (1443–1505), who traveled Northeastern India; he influenced the Mahdavia and the Zikris.
 Báb (1819–1850), who declared himself to be the promised Mahdi in Shiraz, Persia, in 1844. His followers became Baha'is and claim that, among religions which expect a pair of messengers, he is the first of that pair. (Related to Baháʼí claims—see Combination messiah claimants section below.)
 Baháʼu'lláh, Mirza Husayn 'Ali Nuri,(1817-1892). See Combination messiah claimants section below.
 Mirza Ghulam Ahmad of Qadian, India (1835–1908), proclaimed himself to be both the expected Mahdi and Messiah, being the only person in Islamic history who claimed to be both. Crucially, however, he claimed that Jesus had died a natural death after surviving crucifixion, and that prophecies concerning his future advent referred to the Mahdi himself bearing the qualities and character of Jesus rather than to his physical return alongside the Mahdi. He founded the Ahmadiyya Movement in 1889 envisioning it to be the rejuvenation of Islam. Adherents of the Ahmadiyya movement claim to be strictly Muslim, but are widely viewed by other Muslim groups as either disbelievers or heretics.
 Muhammad Ahmad ("The Mad Mahdi") (1844–1885), who declared himself the Mahdi in 1881, defeated the Ottoman Egyptian authority, and founded the Mahdist Sudan.
 Sayyid Mohammed Abdullah Hassan (1864–1920), who led the Dervish State in present-day Somalia in a two-decade long resistance movement against the Ethiopian, British, and Italian Empires between 1900 and 1920.
 Juhayman al-Otaybi (1936–1980), who seized the Grand Mosque in Mecca in November 1979 and declared his brother-in-law the Mahdi.
Hasan Mezarcı (11 May 1954), conservative Islamist politician and member of the Grand National Assembly of Turkey (1991-1995) who was expelled from the Welfare Party and imprisoned for his extreme view against secularism. He claimed to be Isa himself after his imprisonment.
 Adnan Oktar  (2 February 1956), an Islamic creationist cult leader, active in Turkey since 1979. He believes himself to be the Islamic Messiah and focuses his brand of Islam on close reading of the Quran, with dramatic presentations similar to Christian televangelism, and is the author of The Atlas of Creation.
See also Combination messiah claimants below.

Zoroastrian Messiah claimants

 Bahram Chobin, after he usurped the throne of the Sassanian Empire, declared himself to be the Messiah in the midst of the eschatological times of the late 6th century AD

Combination messiah claimants
This list features people who are said, either by themselves or their followers, to be the messianic fulfillment of two or more religious traditions.
 Baháʼu'lláh, Mirza Husayn 'Ali Nuri, (1817–1892), born Shiite, adopting Bábism in 1844 (see "Bab" in Muslim messiah claimants section above). In 1863, he claimed to be the promised one of all religions, and founded the Baháʼí Faith. He claimed to be the fulfillment of the prophecies of the coming of a promised figure found in all 6 of the major prophetic religions (Judaism, Christianity, Islam, Zoroastrianism, Hinduism and Buddhism) as noted in the authoritative history of the Baha'i Faith. He also claimed to be the prophet predicted by the Bab (see Muslim messiah claimants section above) as "He Whom God shall make manifest"  His followers have also claimed that his coming fulfilled prophecies of various smaller (often native) religions.
 Jiddu Krishnamurti (1895-1986) in 1909 renounced the status of Messiah and Maitreya incarnation given him by the Theosophical Society.
 Peter Deunov Bulgarian white brotherhood sect leader
 Riaz Ahmed Gohar Shahi (born 25 November 1941) is a spiritual leader and the founder of the spiritual movements Messiah Foundation International (MFI) and Anjuman Serfaroshan-e-Islam. He is controversial for being declared the Mehdi, Messiah, and Kalki Avatar by the MFI.
 Jose Luis de Jesus Miranda (1946–2013), a Puerto Rican preacher who had claimed to be both "the Man Jesus Christ" and the Antichrist at the same time. He claimed he was indwelled with the same spirit that dwelled in Jesus; however, Miranda also contradicted his claims of being Christ incarnate by also claiming he was the Antichrist, even going as far as tattooing the number of the beast (666) on his forearm, a behavior his followers also adopted. Founder of the "Growing in Grace" ministries, Miranda died on August 14, 2013, due to liver cancer.
 Ryuho Okawa (1956–2023), was the founder of Happy Science in Japan. Okawa claimed to channel the spirits of Muhammad, Christ, Buddha and Confucius and to be the incarnation of the supreme spiritual being called El Cantare.

Other messiah claimants
This list features people who have been said, either by themselves or their followers, to be some form of a messiah that do not easily fit into only Judaism, Christianity, and Islam.
 Cyrus Teed (1839–1908), proponent of the Hollow Earth theory who created a distinct model in which the world is an inverted sphere that the rest of universe can be seen from by looking inward and claimed to be the incarnation of Jesus Christ after being electrocuted when attempting to practice alchemy with doses of magnetism during 1869.

 Emperor Haile Selassie I of Ethiopia (1892–1975), Emperor of Ethiopia and Messiah of the Rastafari movement. Never claimed himself to be Messiah, but was thus proclaimed by Leonard Howell, amongst others.
 André Matsoua (1899–1942), Congolese founder of Amicale, proponents of which subsequently adopted him as Messiah.
 Samael Aun Weor (1917–1977), born Víctor Manuel Gómez Rodríguez, Colombian citizen and later Mexican, was an author, lecturer and founder of the Universal Christian Gnostic Movement. By 1972, Samael Aun Weor referenced that his death and resurrection would be occurring before 1978.
 Nirmala Srivastava (1923–2011), guru of Sahaja Yoga, proclaimed herself to be the Comforter promised by Jesus (that is, the incarnation of the Holy Ghost / Adi Shakti).
 Raël, founder and leader of Raëlism (born 30 September 1946); Rael claimed he met an extraterrestrial being in 1973 and became the Messiah.
 World Teacher (unknown), a being claimed to be the Theosophical Maitreya and the Messiah (promised one) of all religions.  He is said to have descended from the higher planes and manifested a physical body in early 1977 in the Himalayas, then on 19 July 1977 he is said to have taken a commercial airplane flight from Pakistan  to England.  He is currently said to be living in secret in London; promoted by New Age activist Benjamin Creme and his organization, Share International (See Maitreya (Benjamin Creme)).
 David Icke (born 29 April 1952), New Age conspiracy theorist who came up with the idea of Draconians and claimed to be the "son of God" during an interview on Wogan in 1991.
 Shoko Asahara (1955–2018), the founder of the Japanese doomsday-cult group Aum Shinrikyo. In 1992 Asahara published Declaring Myself the Christ, within which he declared himself Christ, Japan's only fully enlightened master, and identified with the Lamb of God. Following the Tokyo subway sarin attack of 1995, Asahara was arrested and executed by hanging in 2018.
 Ezra Miller (b. 1992), an actor, has claimed to be Jesus, the next Messiah, and the devil, saying they would bring about a Native American revolution.

See also
 List of avatar claimants
 List of Buddha claimants
 False prophet
 Jerusalem syndrome
 List of people who have been considered deities
 Messiah complex
 Messianic Age
 Messianism

References

Other sources
 Hogue, John Messiahs: The Visions and Prophecies for the Second Coming (1999) Elements Books 
 Jewish Encyclopedia, a public-domain work hosted at www.jewishencyclopedia.com/ 

Messiah claimants